John Alcock (11 April 1715, London – 23 February 1806) was an English organist and composer. He wrote instrumental music, glees and much church music.

Career
He was a pupil of John Stanley at St. Paul's Cathedral, and he earned a doctorate in music at the University of Oxford in 1766.  Much detail of his life is included in his semi-autobiographical novel, The Life Of Miss Fanny Brown published under the pseudonym John Piper in 1771. He also held a position as private organist to the Earl of Donegall.

He was:
Organist of St Andrew's Church, Plymouth 1737–1741
Organist of St Laurence's Church, Reading 1741–1750
Organist of Lichfield Cathedral 1750–1761
Organist of Holy Trinity Church, Sutton Coldfield 1761–1786
Organist of St. Editha's Church, Tamworth 1766–1790

Personal life
John Alcock married Margaret Beaumont (1711–1792) on 20 May 1737. They had several children, including their eldest son and fellow composer John (1740—1791) and youngest son and organist William (1756—1833).

References

External links

 
 

Cathedral organists
English organists
British male organists
1715 births
1806 deaths
English classical composers
Glee composers
Classical composers of church music
18th-century classical composers
18th-century British male musicians
18th-century keyboardists
English male classical composers
19th-century English musicians
19th-century British male musicians
Male classical organists